Stenanthemum divaricatum is a species of flowering plant in the family Rhamnaceae and is endemic to the southwest of Western Australia. It is a small, often spiny shrub with sparsely hairy young stems, fan-shaped to narrowly egg-shaped leaves and densely, softly-hairy heads of tube-shaped flowers.

Description
The upper surface of the leaves is glabrous and the lower surface is covered with soft, greyish hairs. The flowers are moderately to densely covered with soft, greyish hairs.

Taxonomy and naming
This species was first formally described in 1863 by George Bentham who gave it the name Spyridium divaricatum in Flora Australiensis from specimens collected by Augustus Oldfield. In 1995, Barbara Lynette Rye changed the name to Stenanthemum divaricatum in the journal Nuytsia. The specific epithet (divaricatum) means "widely-spreading" or "forked".

Distribution and habitat
Stenanthemum divaricatum grows in shrubland on sand near Shark Bay in the Carnarvon, Geraldton Sandplains and Yalgoo bioregions of south-western Western Australia.

Conservation status
Stenanthemum divaricatum is listed as "Priority Three" by the Government of Western Australia Department of Biodiversity, Conservation and Attractions, meaning that it is poorly known and known from only a few locations but is not under imminent threat.

References

divaricatum
Rosales of Australia
Flora of Western Australia
Plants described in 1863
Taxa named by George Bentham